Marko Stojanović (born 31 May 1994) is a Serbian-German footballer who plays as a forward for 1. FC Bocholt.

References

External links
 

1994 births
Living people
Serbian footballers
German footballers
Association football forwards
SC Fortuna Köln players
SC Wiedenbrück 2000 players
BSV Schwarz-Weiß Rehden players
SC Verl players
FC Rot-Weiß Koblenz players
1. FC Bocholt players
3. Liga players
Regionalliga players